York Township is one of twelve townships in Carroll County, Illinois, USA.  As of the 2020 census, its population was 2,739 and it contained 905 housing units.

The township was formerly known as Harlem Township until its name was changed in 1850.

Geography

Cities, towns, villages
 Thomson

Unincorporated towns
 Argo Fay
 Ebner
 Ideal
(This list is based on USGS data and may include former settlements.)

Cemeteries
The township contains these two cemeteries: Argo and Lower York.

Major highways
  Illinois Route 78
  Illinois Route 84

Rivers
 Mississippi River
 Upper Mississippi River

Demographics
As of the 2020 census there were 2,739 people, 735 households, and 577 families residing in the township. The racial makeup of the township was 74.22% White, 21.58% African American, 1.39% Native American, 0.29% Asian, 0.04% Pacific Islander, 0.26% from other races, and 2.23% from two or more races. Hispanic or Latino of any race were 8.43% of the population.

There were 735 households, out of which 17.80% had children under the age of 18 living with them, 66.53% were married couples living together, 9.52% had a female householder with no spouse present, and 21.50% were non-families. 17.60% of all households were made up of individuals, and 9.40% had someone living alone who was 65 years of age or older. The average household size was 2.14 and the average family size was 2.35.

The township's age distribution consisted of 10.4% under the age of 18, 4.5% from 18 to 24, 29.1% from 25 to 44, 32.2% from 45 to 64, and 23.8% who were 65 years of age or older. The median age was 50.6 years. For every 100 females, there were 159.7 males. For every 100 females age 18 and over, there were 150.6 males.

The median income for a household in the township was $64,861, and the median income for a family was $76,563. Males had a median income of $44,609 versus $28,456 for females. The per capita income for the township was $29,653. About 2.1% of families and 4.1% of the population were below the poverty line, including 6.9% of those under age 18 and 3.2% of those age 65 or over.

School districts
 West Carroll Community Unit School District 314

Political districts
 Illinois' 16th congressional district
 State House District 71
 State Senate District 36

References
 
 United States Census Bureau 2007 TIGER/Line Shapefiles
 United States National Atlas

External links
 City-Data.com
 Illinois State Archives
 Carroll County official site

Townships in Carroll County, Illinois
Townships in Illinois